2,6-Diformylpyridine is an organic compound with the formula C5H3N(CHO)2.  The molecule features formyl groups adjacent to the nitrogen of pyridine.  The compound is prepared by oxidation of 2,6-dimethylpyridine.

It condenses with amines to give diiminopyridine ligands, as was demonstrated in Fraser Stoddart's synthesis of molecular Borromean rings.

Related compounds
 2,6-Diacetylpyridine

References 

Aromatic aldehydes
Pyridines